The 2005 National League Cup (known for commercial reasons as the Northern Rail Cup) was a British rugby league competition. The 2005 competition was the first to feature sides from National League Three: previously the competition had only featured sides from National Leagues One and Two.

There were no cross-group games in the 2005 competition, each team therefore playing only six games in the group stages. The top team from each of the first five groups progressed to the quarter-final directly. The second-placed team in each of these groups, plus the top team from group six (the group of teams from National League 3), played an additional round to determine the remaining three spots in the quarter-finals.

The winners of the 2005 Northern Rail Cup were Hull Kingston Rovers.

Results

Group stages

Group 1

Group 2

Group 3

Group 4

Group 5

Group 6

Knockout stages
Home team given first.

Play-off Round
Swinton Lions 40–24 Batley Bulldogs (1 May) 
Featherstone Rovers 44–20 Workington Town (1 May)
Hull Kingston Rovers 64–14 Bradford Dudley Hill (1 May)

Quarter-finals
Featherstone Rovers 14–38 Castleford Tigers (29 May) 
Doncaster Dragons 54–38 Halifax (29 May) 
Whitehaven 28–22 Rochdale Hornets(29 May)
Hull Kingston Rovers 62–0 Swinton Lions (29 May)

Semi-finals
Hull Kingston Rovers 28–26 Doncaster Dragons (19 June) 
Castleford Tigers 36–14 Whitehaven (19 June)

Final
Castleford Tigers 16–18 Hull Kingston Rovers (17 July, Bloomfield Road, Blackpool)

See also

References

External links

Northern Rail Cup
Northern Rail Cup
Championship Cup